Diospilus is a genus of insects belonging to the family Braconidae.

The genus has cosmopolitan distribution.

Species:
 Diospilus abbreviator (Schiodte, 1839)
 Diospilus acourti Cockerell, 1921

References

Braconidae
Braconidae genera